Petre Milincovici (5 May 1936 – 20 January 2019) was a Romanian rower. He competed in the men's coxed four event at the 1960 Summer Olympics.

References

1936 births
2019 deaths
Romanian male rowers
Olympic rowers of Romania
Rowers at the 1960 Summer Olympics
Sportspeople from Arad, Romania